Glipostenoda taiwana is a species of beetle in the genus Glipostenoda. It was described in 1934.

References

taiwana
Beetles described in 1934
Taxa named by Hiromichi Kono